Jiří Brdečka (24 December 1917 – 2 June 1982) was a Czech writer, artist, and film director.

Life
Brdečka was born in Hranice (then in Austria-Hungary) to a literary family; his father, Otakar Brdečka (1881 – 1930), wrote under the pseudonym Alfa. Brdečka studied philosophy and aesthetics at Charles University in Prague until the German occupation of Czechoslovakia forced the closing of the school in 1939. He then became an administrative clerk at the Prague Municipal Museum and found occasional work as a newspaper journalist and cartoonist. He worked as a press agent for the studio  from summer 1941 to the end of 1942. In 1943 Brdečka took a job as an animator, and by 1949 he was working as a film director and screenwriter at Barrandov Studios. He began directing animated films on his own in 1958. In addition to his film work he also worked as a journalist, a film critic and a novelist.

Brdečka's work is marked by its droll intellectual humor, often featuring an extensive use of hyperbole, satire, and literary illusions.

He had one daughter, the writer and film critic  (born 1952).

Brdečka died in 1982 in Prague.

Selected filmography

Director
 Wedding in the Coral Sea (1944)
 Springman and the SS (1946)

Screenwriter
 Springman and the SS (1946)
 The Emperor's Nightingale (1948)
 The Emperor and the Golem (1951)
 Old Czech Legends (1951)
 Lost Children (1956)
 The Fabulous World of Jules Verne (1958)
 A Midsummer Night's Dream (1959)
 The Fabulous Baron Munchausen (1961)
 The Cassandra Cat (1963)
 Lemonade Joe (1964)
 Dinner for Adele (1977)
 The Prince and the Evening Star (1979)
 The Mysterious Castle in the Carpathians (1981)

References

External links
 
 Essay on Jiří Brdečka by Gene Deitch

1917 births
1982 deaths
People from Hranice (Přerov District)
People from the Margraviate of Moravia
Czech animated film directors
Czech journalists
Czech cartoonists
Czech humorists
Czech satirists
Czech screenwriters
Male screenwriters
20th-century journalists
20th-century screenwriters
Czechoslovak writers
Charles University alumni